Sots or SOTS may refer to:

People
 Viktor Sots (born 1958), Soviet weightlifter

Places
 Lassouts (Aveyron, Occitan, France; a commune

Entertainment
 Slaughter of the Soul, an album by Swedish band At the Gates
 Sounds of the 60s, a BBC radio show
 Sound of the South Marching Band, the marching band at Troy University
 Sword of the Stars, a 4X videogame
 Sots art, Soviet pop art
 Signs of the Swarm, an American Deathcore band

Government and politics
 State of the State address, a speech given by a state chief executive
 Special Operations Training School, of the Kenya Special Forces
 Sons of the South, a Lebanese Christian faction of the Lebanese Civil War

Other uses
 Society for Old Testament Study, a professional body of scholars of the Hebrew Bible / Old Testament in the UK and Ireland
 Squawk on the Street, a financial television show on CNBC

See also

 prince des sots, a Christmastide character
 
 
 Sot (disambiguation)
 STS (disambiguation)
 SOS (disambiguation)
 SS_(disambiguation)